New Bridge Landing, signed as New Bridge Landing at River Edge, is an active commuter railroad station in the borough of River Edge, Bergen County, New Jersey. Located at the junction of Kinderkamack Road (County Route 503) and Grand Avenue (County Route S-49) and next to Route 4, the station is serviced by Pascack Valley Line trains running between Hoboken Terminal in Hoboken and Spring Valley station in the eponymous village in Rockland County, New York. The next station to the north is the eponymous River Edge and the next station to the south is Anderson Street in Hackensack. The station contains a single low-level side platform on the southbound side of the track, resulting in the station not being accessible for handicapped persons per the Americans with Disabilities Act of 1990. 

Railroad service in the area began on March 4, 1870, when the Hackensack and New York Extension Railroad opened from the terminal in Hackensack to a new station in Hillsdale. At the time of opening, the station was known as Cherry Hill. In 1895, the name was changed to North Hackensack, a name it would retain until April 2009, when it was changed to New Bridge Landing, in reference to the former hamlet. The station depot at then-North Hackensack, built by the Erie Railroad, came down in 1978.

History

The station was built in 1870, as part of the northern extension of the New Jersey and New York Railroad from Hackensack's station at Essex Street. The station depot was demolished in 1978 and replaced by a shelter.

The station is named for the nearby tide mill hamlet New Bridge Landing, where George Washington and Thomas Paine crossed the narrows of the Hackensack River in his retreat after the loss of Fort Washington during the New York and New Jersey campaign in 1776.

Due to increased ridership from bi-directional operation, an additional 143 parking spaces were added to a permit only parking lot on August 13, 2008, bringing the total number of spaces at the station to 291.

During December 2022, the station along with the Anderson Street, Hackensack Station were awarded 18 million dollars to make the stations more accessible. The grants will fully modernize the stations, and make them more accessible. They will also add ADA compliant ramps.

Station layout
This station has one track one low-level side platform. Bicycle parking is available at the station. The station has a 291-space parking lot, which is operated by ParkAmerica.

References

External links 

Borough of River Edge
Bergen County Historical Society
 Station from Google Maps Street View

NJ Transit Rail Operations stations
River Edge, New Jersey
Former Erie Railroad stations
Railway stations in Bergen County, New Jersey
Demolished railway stations in the United States
Railway stations in the United States opened in 1870
1870 establishments in New Jersey